Back to Love may refer to:

Music

Albums
 Back to Love (Mr. Fingers album), 1994
 Back to Love (Beth Nielsen Chapman album), 2010
 Back to Love (Anthony Hamilton album), 2011
 Back to Love (Jolina Magdangal album), 2015
 Back to Love (Vanessa Amorosi album), 2019

Songs
 "Back to Love" (Evelyn King song), 1982
 "Back to Love" (Estelle song), 2011
 "Back to Love" (DJ Pauly D song), 2013 
 "Back to Love" (Chris Brown song), 2019

See also
 Back 2 Love (disambiguation)